The tepui foliage-gleaner (Syndactyla roraimae), also known as the white-throated foliage-gleaner, is a species of bird in the family Furnariidae. It is found in forest and woodland in the tepuis of Brazil, Guyana and Venezuela.

It was formerly placed in the genus Automolus, but behavior, voice and morphology all point to it belonging in Syndactyla, and recent genetic analyses confirmed this placement.

References

tepui foliage-gleaner
Birds of the Tepuis
tepui foliage-gleaner
Taxonomy articles created by Polbot